Roderick Edward "Legs" McNeil (born January 27, 1956, in Cheshire, Connecticut, United States) is an American music journalist. He is one of the three original founders of the seminal Punk magazine that gave the movement its name; as well as being a former editor at Spin and editor-in-chief of Nerve Magazine.

Punk Magazine
At the age of 19, McNeil gathered with two high school friends, John Holmstrom and Ged Dunn, and decided to create "some sort of media thing" for a living. Holmstrom had an idea of combining comics with rock n roll. They settled upon a magazine, assuming that people would "think [they were] cool and hang out with [them]" as well as "give [them] free drinks", and it worked. Within days of its first publication, Punk Magazine, McNeil, Holmstrom, and Dunn were famous.

The name "Punk" was decided upon because "it seemed to sum up...everything...obnoxious, smart but not pretentious, absurd, ironic, and things that appealed to the darker side". Holstrom wanted to call it "Teenage News Gazette" to which Ged said, "Absolutely not." The name Punk was McNeil's idea; Dunn agreed to it instantly, Holmstrom rather reluctantly.

Nicknamed "Resident Punk" in the magazine, McNeil claims (to much dispute) that he was the first person (along with co-founder John Holmstrom) to have coined the term "punk" to describe a certain type of music, fashion, and attitude. He says he came up with the name punk because Telly Savalas used the line "You lousy punk!" on the show Kojak. According to McNeil: "After four years of doing Punk magazine, and basically getting laughed at, suddenly everything was "punk," so I quit the magazine."

Later work
McNeil is the co-author (with Gillian McCain) of Please Kill Me: The Uncensored Oral History of Punk, which has been published in 12 languages and helped launch the oral history trend in music books. The New York Times called the book "lurid, insolent, disorderly, funny, sometimes gross, sometimes mean and occasionally touching."

McNeil is also co-author of The Other Hollywood: The Uncensored Oral History of the Porn Film Industry. As Publishers Weekly said, "This compulsively readable book perfectly captures the pop culture zeitgeist. It doesn't hurt that the history of American pornography is inextricably intertwined with all the subjects that captivate us: sex, drugs, beauty, fame, money, the Mafia, law enforcement and violence."

McNeil is also the co-author of I Slept with Joey Ramone (A Punk Rock Family Memoir) with Mickey Leigh, Joey Ramone’s brother.

McNeil's most recent book, Dear Nobody: The True Diary of Mary Rose is another collaborative effort with Gillian McCain. Dear Nobody was published on April 1, 2014, and received widespread critical acclaim.

McNeil has appeared on many TV documentaries, from the History Channel to VH1, and has produced and hosted a three-hour TV special on Court TV over three nights on the porn industry, which was the highest-rated original programming in that network's history.

In 2016, a 2014 interview with McNeil was featured in Danny Says, the biographical documentary about the influential rock music publicist, Danny Fields, appearing alongside Fields, Iggy Pop, Alice Cooper, and others.

Works

Oral histories 
 Please Kill Me: The Uncensored Oral History of Punk with Gillian McCain (Grove Press, 1996).
 The Other Hollywood: The Uncensored Oral History of the Porn Film Industry, with Jennifer Osborne and Peter Pavia (Regan Books, 2006).

Memoir 
 I Slept with Joey Ramone: A Family Memoir with Mickey Leigh (Simon and Schuster, 2009).

References

External links
 Legs McNeil Gothamist interview
 Legs McNeil Glorious Noise interview
 pleasekillme.com - Legs McNeil's website

1956 births
Living people
American magazine editors
American music journalists
American magazine founders
Writers from Connecticut